Imperial is a city in Imperial County, California,  north of El Centro.

As of the 2010 census, the city had a population of 14,758. It is part of the El Centro metropolitan area. In 2016, Imperial was the fourth fastest-growing city in the state, gaining 4.1 percent more residents from January 1, 2015, to January 1, 2016. It compares to Imperial County's growth of 1.3 percent and Brawley's growth of 1.2 percent.

History

Imperial was created by the Imperial Land Company  and was named by George Chaffey. Imperial's first post office opened in 1901. Imperial incorporated in 1904. The first mayor of Imperial was Allison Peck.

The town-site of Imperial was plotted in 1902 for home and commercial businesses. Its first buildings included a printing press, drug store, grocery store, brick building, and church. The city can also boast of having the first school in the valley and the first Chamber of Commerce.

The City of Imperial was incorporated July 12, 1904 thus being the first city in the valley to incorporate. The city was originally thought to become the county seat, but lost out to the City of El Centro in 1907.

Imperial through the years became the location for the home of the Imperial Irrigation District, the California Mid-Winter Fair and the Imperial County airport. Also several businesses were established in the city. Imperial was devastated by earthquakes in 1916 and 1940. An earthquake in 1979 destroyed many of the old buildings in the downtown business area, including City Hall. Re-building of the business district was slow for many years.

June 2014 a McDonnell Douglas AV-8B Harrier II from Marine Corps Air Station Yuma crashed in a residential area. The pilot ejected safely.

Geography
Imperial is located in the Imperial Valley (considered locally as synonymous with Imperial County). The city is 59.5 feet (18.14 m) below sea level. The Imperial Valley is in the Colorado Desert, an extension of the larger Sonoran Desert.

The agriculture industry's demand for water is supplied by canals diverting water from the nearby Colorado River. The Salton Sea was created after a 1905 flood from the Colorado River.

In this region, the geology is dominated by the transition of the tectonic plate boundary from rift to transverse fault. The southernmost strands of the San Andreas Fault connect the northernmost extensions of the East Pacific Rise. Consequently, the region is subject to earthquakes, and the crust is being stretched, resulting in a sinking of the terrain over time.

Climate
Imperial has a hot desert climate, featuring long, extremely hot summers and mild winters. Imperial averages just about 3 inches of rain annually, with December being the wettest month. The North American Monsoon typically increases the humidity from July through September. At times, the climate can resemble that of tropical areas in the Caribbean. This leads to daily thunderstorms that can bring hail, downpours, lightning, and dust storms more commonly known as Haboob. During the eastern Pacific hurricane season, hurricanes occasionally track up the Baja California Peninsula and bring remnants of Tropical Storms through the desert that can result in flash flooding and heavy widespread thunderstorms. This can lead to significantly higher than normal precipitation, at times bringing heavy rain in short periods of time. The precipitation in the winter months is predominantly rain showers from the occasional winter storms. At times these storms bring cold temperatures to Imperial and surrounding cities, and mountain snowfall to the nearby mountains. Snow is almost totally unknown in the city, except for trace amount on December 12, 1932, and a very brief fall of sleet mixed with hail during a shower in December 1967. On average there are about 11 days that dip into the mid to lower 30s. In January, the normal high temperature is 67 degrees with a low of 39. In July, the normal high temperature is 105 degrees with a low of 77.

Demographics

2010
The 2010 United States Census reported that Imperial had a population of 14,758. The racial makeup of Imperial was 9,298 (63.0%) White, 331 (2.2%) African American, 154 (1.0%) Native American,  370 (2.5%) Asian, 13 (0.1%) Pacific Islander, 3,783 (25.6%) from other races, and 809 (5.5%) from two or more races. The ethnic makeup of Imperial was 11,046 (74.8%) Hispanic or Latino of any race.

The Census reported that 14,727 people (99.8% of the population) lived in households, 0 (0%) lived in non-institutionalized group quarters, and 31 (0.2%) were institutionalized.

There were 4,405 households, out of which 2,464 (55.9%) had children under the age of 18 living in them, 2,669 (60.6%) were opposite-sex married couples living together, 697 (15.8%) had a female householder with no husband present, 255 (5.8%) had a male householder with no wife present.  There were 268 (6.1%) unmarried opposite-sex partnerships, and 27 (0.6%) same-sex married couples or partnerships. 621 households (14.1%) were made up of individuals, and 181 (4.1%) had someone living alone who was 65 years of age or older. The average household size was 3.34.  There were 3,621 families (82.2% of all households); the average family size was 3.69.

The population was spread out, with 4,927 people (33.4%) under the age of 18, 1,376 people (9.3%) aged 18 to 24, 4,618 people (31.3%) aged 25 to 44, 2,881 people (19.5%) aged 45 to 64, and 956 people (6.5%) who were 65 years of age or older.  The median age was 29.9 years. For every 100 females, there were 95.6 males.  For every 100 females age 18 and over, there were 92.3 males.

The homeowner vacancy rate was 4.5%; the rental vacancy rate was 4.5%.  10,692 people (72.4% of the population) lived in owner-occupied housing units and 4,035 people (27.3%) lived in rental housing units.

2000
As of the census of 2000, there were 8,100 people, 2,308 households, and 1,911 families residing in the city. The racial makeup of the city was 58.5% White, 2.7% Black or African American, 0.8% Native American, 2.7% Asian, 0.2% Pacific Islander, 30.9% from other races, and 4.3% from two or more races.  61.1% of the population were Hispanic or Latino of any race.

There were 2,308 households, out of which 53.9% had children under the age of 18 living with them, 65.9% were married couples living together, 13.0% had a female householder with no husband present, and 17.2% were non-families. 14.0% of all households were made up of individuals, and 5.2% had someone living alone who was 65 years of age or older.  The average household size was 3.3 and the average family size was 3.6.

In the city, the population was spread out, with 35.3% under the age of 18, 7.8% from 18 to 24, 33.8% from 25 to 44, 16.8% from 45 to 64, and 6.3% who were 65 years of age or older.  The median age was 30 years. For every 100 females, there were 96.8 males.  For every 100 females age 18 and over, there were 91.5 males.

The median income for a household in the city was $49,451, and the median income for a family was $53,053. Males had a median income of $37,373 versus $27,778 for females. The per capita income for the city was $16,538.  About 8.9% of families and 11.6% of the population were below the poverty line, including 15.2% of those under age 18 and 5.2% of those age 65 or over.

Arts and culture 

The annual California Mid-Winter Fair takes place in Imperial, often in February, and receives over 100,000 visitors.

The California Mid-Winter Fairgrounds is located in the heart of Imperial. The Mid-Winter Fair is the county's largest attended event. The fair lasts for a total of 10 days and is held at the end of February or beginning of March each year. The fairgrounds will host other events during the year such as; festivals, barbecues, car races, concerts, trade shows, and private parties. Visitors are from nearby Mexicali, Baja California, Mexico and numerous "snowbirds" across Southern California and the country (U.S.) temporarily reside in Imperial.

Imperial is also home to the Imperial Market Days.

Imperial Market Days is a signature, sponsorship funded event series put on by the City of Imperial to promote quality of life opportunities locally and throughout the Imperial Valley. Starting in October, the events take place in Downtown Imperial. These events are free for the public to attend. The synergy between local businesses and the community has attracted record crowds of up to 13,000 people throughout the region. Over 100 vendors participate in each event.

Government

Infrastructure

Utilities
The city operates its own water and sewer system. Trash service is provided by Republic Services. Other utility providers for Imperial are Southern California Gas, Imperial Irrigation District, AT&T California, and Spectrum.

Notable people
 Charles Harris Garrigues, newspaperman
 Ben Hulse, member of the California State Senate
 Royce Freeman, football player
 Andy Ruiz Jr., boxer, former WBA (Super), IBF, WBO, and IBO world heavyweight champion.

See also

 San Diego–Imperial, California
 El Centro Metropolitan Area
 Imperial County Airport

References

External links

 
 Imperial Chamber of Commerce

Imperial

Communities in the Lower Colorado River Valley
Imperial Valley
Incorporated cities and towns in California
Populated places in the Colorado Desert
Populated places established in 1904
Imperial